The Chimayo Trading Post and E.D. Trujillo House, at 110 Sandia Dr. in Espanola, New Mexico, was built in 1939.  It was listed on the National Register of Historic Places in 1999.

It has also been known as "The Original" Chimayo Trading Post.

References

External links

Trading posts
National Register of Historic Places in Rio Arriba County, New Mexico
Traditional Native American dwellings
Buildings and structures completed in 1939
1939 establishments in New Mexico
Pueblo Revival architecture in New Mexico
Native American history of New Mexico